Gel-e Gurchak (also Romanized as Gel-e Gūrchak; also known as Gūrchak, Gol Gūrchak-e Bālā, Qal‘eh Gīrshāh, and Qal‘eh-ye Gīr Shāh) is a village in Zhan Rural District, in the Central District of Dorud County, Lorestan Province, Iran. At the 2006 census, its population was 469, in 91 families.

References 

Towns and villages in Dorud County